Uranium triiodide is an inorganic compound with the chemical formula UI3.  It is a black solid that is soluble in water.

Production
Uranium triiodide can be obtained from the direct reaction of its constituent elements:
2 U + 3 I2 → 2 UI3

When the reaction is conducted in tetrahydrofuran (THF), the product is the blue complex UI3(THF)4.

Properties
It crystallizes in the orthorhombic crystal system (plutonium tribromide-type) in the space group Ccmm with the lattice parameters a = 432.8 pm, b = 1401.1 pm, and c = 1000.5 pm and four formula units per unit cell. 

Uranium triiodide is Lewis acidic.

References

Uranium(III) compounds
Iodides
Actinide halides